The Dakota Marker is the trophy awarded to the winner of the annual football game played between the rival Division I Championship Subdivision North Dakota State University Bison and the South Dakota State University Jackrabbits. Both schools are members of the Missouri Valley Football Conference.

The Marker

The trophy is a model replica of the quartzite monuments that marked the border between North and South Dakota when Dakota Territory split into two states along the Seventh Standard Parallel (45°56'07" N). The monuments were seven feet tall and ten inches square at the top, and were mined and inscribed near Sioux Falls. Charles Bates placed 720 markers at half-mile intervals along the border in the summers of 1891 and 1892. The monuments inscribed with the initials "N.D." on the north side and "S.D." on the south side.

Adam Jones, then-President of the NDSU Chapter of Blue Key National Honor Society, proposed the trophy itself and unveiled it to the public on April 21, 2004 at a ceremony just outside Hankinson, North Dakota, a community near the North Dakota/South Dakota border.

The inscriptions include: N.D., S.D., and 190 M (the distance between Fargo, ND and Brookings, SD along Interstate 29). The trophy weighs nearly 75 pounds and is commonly carried around the field immediately after the game's conclusion by the winning team.

Rivalry history
NDSU and SDSU regularly played each other for several decades as members of the Division II North Central Conference. In 2004, the move by both schools to Division I FCS prompted the creation of the trophy, as both schools lost their primary in-state rivals (NDSU/UND and SDSU/USD) who both remained in Division II at the time. Both teams became members of the newly formed Great West Football Conference, and the annual NDSU/SDSU game took on more importance from a regional bragging rights standpoint as the "closest neighbor" football rivalry. The series continued when both teams joined the Missouri Valley Football Conference in 2008. The series often proves decisive in determining the Missouri Valley conference championship winner each season and both teams have been regular playoff participants at the FCS level. 

In addition to the regular season game played for the Marker each year, the two teams have met five times in FCS playoff games, with the Bison holding a 4-1 lead against the Jackrabbits in the postseason. 4 of these games were played in Fargo as playoff matches, all of which resulted in victories by North Dakota State; NDSU would later go on to win the championship in all of those seasons. However, in their first ever meeting in the NCAA Division I Football Championship game in Frisco, South Dakota State defeated NDSU in the 2023 NCAA Division I Football Championship Game with a score of 45-21, earning the Jackrabbits their first FCS championship as well as their sole postseason win against the Bison.

The Dakota Marker series currently stands in favor of NDSU 10–9. SDSU is currently in possession of the trophy after winning the latest game in the regular season series, a 23-21 victory in Fargo on October 15, 2022. The 2019 Marker Game in Brookings was notable for the visit of College GameDay, the flagship college football pregame show broadcast by ESPN. The show originated live from the SDSU campus on the morning of the game as the Bison entered the contest ranked #1 in FCS and undefeated at 7-0, with SDSU ranked #3 and coming in 6-1. The home team has won 11 of the 18 Marker games since the inception of the series.

The two teams have now met 113 times in their history, and the Bison lead the overall series 63-45, with 5 ties. Their 100th meeting was the first time they met in the playoffs (2012), with the Bison claiming a 28–3 victory.

Game results

^The Marker was not at stake in these five games, as they were playoff games.

See also 
 List of NCAA college football rivalry games
 List of most-played college football series in NCAA Division I

References

College football rivalry trophies in the United States
North Dakota State Bison football
South Dakota State Jackrabbits football